Douglas Curtis Swan (February 17, 1920 – June 17, 1996) was an American comics artist. The artist most associated with Superman during the period fans call the Bronze Age of Comic Books, Swan produced hundreds of covers and stories from the 1950s through the 1980s.

Biography

Early life and career
Curt Swan, whose Swedish grandmother had shortened and Americanized the original family name of Svensson, was born in Minneapolis, the youngest of five children. Father John Swan worked for the railroads; mother Leontine Jessie Hanson had worked in a local hospital. As a boy, Swan's given name – Douglas – was shortened to "Doug," and, disliking the phonetic similarity to "Dog," Swan thereafter reversed the order of his given names and went by "Curtis Douglas," rather than "Douglas Curtis."

Having enlisted in Minnesota's National Guard's 135th Regiment, 34th Division in 1940, Swan was sent to Europe when the "federalized" division was shipped initially to Northern Ireland and Scotland. While his comrades in the 34th eventually went into combat in North Africa and Italy, Swan spent most of World War II working as an artist for the G.I. magazine Stars and Stripes. While at Stars and Stripes, Swan met writer France Herron, who eventually directed him to DC Comics.

During this period Swan married the former Helene Brickley, whom he had met at a dance at Fort Dix, New Jersey, and who was stationed near him in Paris in 1944 as a Red Cross worker; they were married in Paris in April 1945. Shortly after returning to civilian life in 1945, he moved from Minnesota to New Jersey and began working for DC Comics. Apart from a few months of night classes at the Pratt Institute under the G.I. Bill, Swan was an entirely self-taught artist. After a stint on Boy Commandos he began to just pencil pages, leaving the inking to others.

Superman

Initially, Swan drew many different features, including "Tommy Tomorrow" and "Gangbusters", but slowly he began gravitating towards the Superman line of books. His first job pencilling the iconic character was for Superman #51 (March–April 1948). Many comics of the 1940s and 1950s lacked contributor credits, but research shows that Swan began pencilling the Superboy series with its fifth issue in 1949. He drew the first comics meeting of Superman and Batman in Superman #76 (May–June 1952). The two heroes began teaming on a regular basis in World's Finest Comics #71 (July–August 1954) in a story which was also drawn by Swan. Swan always felt that his breakthrough came when he was assigned the art duties on Superman's Pal, Jimmy Olsen, in 1954.

Swan didn't take to line editor Mort Weisinger's controlling style. Swan discussed this period in an interview: "I was getting terrible migraine headaches and had these verbal battles with Mort. So it was emotional, physical. It just drained me and I thought I'd better get out of here before I go whacko." After leaving comics for the advertising world in 1951, Swan soon returned, for DC's higher paychecks. And as biographer Eddy Zeno notes, "The headaches went away after [Swan] gained Weisinger's respect by standing up to him."

Around 1954, Swan unsuccessfully pitched an original comic strip for newspaper syndication. Called Yellow Hair, it was about a blond boy raised by Native Americans. A couple of years later, starting with the episode of June 18, 1956, Swan drew the Superman daily newspaper comic strip, which he continued on until November 12, 1960.

In the view of comics historian Les Daniels, Swan became the definitive artist of Superman in the early 1960s with a "new look" to the character that replaced Wayne Boring's version. The Composite Superman was co-created by Swan and Edmond Hamilton in World's Finest Comics #142 (June 1964). Swan and writer Jim Shooter crafted the story "Superman's Race with the Flash!" in Superman #199 (August 1967) which featured the first race between the Flash and Superman, two characters known for their super-speed powers. Over the years, Swan was a remarkably consistent and prolific artist, often illustrating two or more titles per month. Swan remained as artist of Superman when Julius Schwartz became the editor of the title with issue #233 (January 1971), and writer Denny O'Neil streamlined the Superman mythos, starting with the elimination of Kryptonite. Among Swan's contributions to the Superman mythos, he and writer Cary Bates co-created the supervillains Terra-Man and the 1970s version of the Toyman as well as the superhero Vartox. Writer Martin Pasko and Swan created the Master Jailer character in Superman #331 (January 1979).

Later life and career

After DC's 1985 12-issue limited series Crisis on Infinite Earths and with the impending 1986 revision of Superman by writer/artist John Byrne, Swan was released from his duties on the Superman comics. Critic Wallace Harrington summed up Swan's dismissal this way:

Swan's last work as regular artist on Superman was the non-canonical 1986 story "Whatever Happened to the Man of Tomorrow?", written by Alan Moore.

After this, Swan continued to do occasional minor projects for DC, including the artwork of what is thought to be one of the rarest Superman comics ever published, titled "This Island Bradman" (written by David P. Levin), a comic book that was privately commissioned in 1988 by real estate tycoon Godfrey Bradman as a Bar Mitzvah gift for his son, as well as an Aquaman limited series and special in 1989, and various returns on illustrating Superman, including the prestige format graphic novel one-shot Superman: The Earth Stealers in 1988.

In 1995, Swan did four illustrations for Penthouse Comix for the Larry Niven essay "Man of Steel, Woman of Kleenex," which detailed the problems that Superman would face in having sexual intercourse and reproducing with a human woman, using arguments based on humorous yet logical reconciliations between physics, biology, and the abilities of Kryptonians as presented in the Superman comic books.

Swan's swan song was five pages published posthumously in the 1996 special Superman: The Wedding Album.

Swan died June 17, 1996 in Wilton, Connecticut. Helene Swan died at the age of 91 on January 27, 2012.

A previously unpublished story featuring Swan's art debuted in Action Comics #1000.

Art style
Comics historian Arlen Schumer praised Swan's ability to depict "the spectrum of human emotion, from agony to anger, mournful to mirthful." As characterized by critic Paul Gravett, Swan's Superman made "...Krypton's last son in exile, the alien in our midst, into someone like us, who would think and feel as well as act, who was approachable, big-hearted, considerate, maybe physically superpowerful yet gentle, noble yet subtly tragic." In a similar vein, Swan biographer Eddy Zeno calls Swan "the Norman Rockwell of ... comics." Gary Groth, the editor-in-chief of The Comics Journal, was less complimentary, remarking that "Swan is symptomatic of what the industry requires. They adore Swan at DC because they give Swan a script and it says 'Superman flies out the window'...and there's Superman flying out the window. The script says 'Clark Kent walking down the hall' and there's Clark Kent walking down a hall. He's just a technician who does exactly what's required of him."

With his frequent inker Murphy Anderson from 1970–1974 and 1988–1989, the pair's collaborative artwork came to be called "Swanderson" by the fans. Despite his and Anderson's success together, Swan's favorite inker was Al Williamson, with whom he only worked for a short time, from 1985–1986.

Legacy
In 1985, DC Comics named Swan as one of the honorees in the company's 50th anniversary publication Fifty Who Made DC Great.

Swan's favorite story – one of the few he both pencilled and inked – was "I Flew with Superman" from Superman Annual #9 (1983), in which Swan himself appears and helps Superman solve a case.

In a story titled "Swan's Way", issue #92 of the Legion of Super-Heroes (May 1997) memorialized Swan with a cameo appearance as an art teacher.

Elliot S. Maggin:

Alan Moore:

The Westport Arts Center has dedicated a granite plaque in memoriam of Curt Swan, alongside others Connecticut artists.

Bibliography
Swan's comics work (interior pencil art) includes:

 Action Comics (Tommy Tomorrow) #127–171; (Superman) #189, 244, 253, 256, 260, 265, 269, 270, 272, 277–278, 280, 283–284, 286–288, 290, 295, 297–298, 303–305, 307, 309–312, 318–321, 325–327, 330, 334, 336, 338–339, 343, 351–352, 355, 358–359, 367–390, 393–473, 477–485, 487–500, 502–524, 527–534, 537, 542–544, 547, 555, 556–557, 568, 583, 658 (full art); #601–642 (two-page stories); #600, 650, 667, 723 (among other artists) (1948–1996)
 Action Comics Annual #2 (among other artists) (1989)
 Adventure Comics (Superboy) #156, 159–160, 167, 169, 174, 176, 178, 179–180, 182, 184–185, 187, 190–192, 195, 197–198, 201, 205, 208, 210–212, 214–220, 223, 224–225, 227, 230, 238, 241–243, 246, 249, 257, 279, 285, 291, 293, 301–302, 311, 320, 327–328, 330, 334, 336, 339; (Legion of Super-Heroes) #313, 340–347, 349–360, 365–372 (1950–1968)
 The Adventures of Superboy #22 (1992)
 The Adventures of Superboy Special #1 (1992)
 Adventures of Superman #471 (full art); #480, 536 (among other artists) (1990–1996)
 Adventures of Superman Annual #2 (among other artists) (1990)
 All-Star Squadron #15 (1982)
 The Amazing World of Superman, Metropolis Edition #1 (pencils from Carmine Infantino layouts) (1973)
 Aquaman vol. 3 #1–5 (pencils from Keith Giffen layouts) (1989)
 Aquaman Special #1 (1989)
 Arak, Son of Thunder (Masters of the Universe) #15 (1982)
 Batman #70 (1952), #358 (1983)
 Batman: A Word to the Wise (1992)
 The Batman Chronicles (Robin) #6 (1996)
 The Batman Family (Batgirl and Robin) #5, 7, 11 (1976–1977)
 Boy Commandos #16–20, 22, 25–31, 33 (1946–1949)
 Captain Carrot and His Amazing Zoo Crew! (Masters of the Universe) #9 (1982)
 DC Comics Presents #30, 35, 47, 50–51, 53, 56, 58, 67–68, 71, 77–80, 87, 91–92 (1981–1986)
 DC Special Series (Superman) #5 (1977)
 DC Super Stars (Superboy) #12 (1977)
 Detective Comics (Boy Commandos) #110–127, 129–133, 135, 138–143, 149 (1946–1949)
 The Fury of Firestorm (Masters ...) #6 (1982)
 The Fury of Firestorm Annual #4 (among other artists) (1986)
 Gang Busters #10–13, 15–20, 22, 25–27, 29, 32–42 (1949–1954)
 Ghosts #4 (1972)
 Hawk and Dove #28 (with Greg Guler) (1991)
 Hawk and Dove Annual #1 (among other artists) (1991)
 Heroes Against Hunger #1 (two-page story, among other artists) (1986)
 House of Mystery #1–6, 8, 10–29 (1951–1954)
 Justice League Quarterly (General Glory) #16 (among other artists) (1994)
 The Krypton Chronicles miniseries #1–3 (1981)
 L.E.G.I.O.N. '94 Annual #5 (among other artists) (Elseworlds, 1994)
 Legion of Super-Heroes vol. 2 #300 (five-page story); #306 (with Keith Giffen) (1983)
 Legion of Super-Heroes vol. 3 #45 (five-page story, among other artists) (1988)
 Legion of Super-Heroes vol. 4 #31 (with Colleen Doran) (1992)
 Legion of Super-Heroes Annual #3 (1984)
 Legion of Super-Heroes Annual #2 (1986)
 Legion of Super-Heroes Annual #5 (among other artists) (1990)
 M.A.S.K. vol. 2 #1–9 (1987)
 Mr. District Attorney #9–10, 15, 21 (1949–1951)
 The New Adventures of Superboy #51 (1984)
 The New Teen Titans #5, 25 (1981–1982)
 The New Teen Titans vol. 2 #43 (1988)
 The New Titans #81, 86 (1991–1992)
 The New Titans Annual #6 (full art); #8 (among other artists) (1990–1992)
 The Phantom Stranger #5 (two-page story) (1970)
 The Power of Shazam! #8, 11, 17 (with Pete Krause) (1995–1996)
 Real Fact Comics #7–8, 13, 16–17, 19, 21 (1947–1949)
 Secret Hearts #17 (1953)
 Secret Origins vol. 2 (Justice League of America) #46; (Legion of Super-Heroes) #46–47 (1989–1990)
 Showcase (Manhunters) #5 (1956)
 Star-Spangled Comics (Newsboy Legion) #55, 61–64; (Robin) #72; (Manhunters Around the World) 94–108, 114–120; (War stories) #131–133 (1946–1952)
 Star Spangled War Stories #3–13, 16–17 (1952–1954)
 Star Trek #37 (1984)
 Star Trek Annual #3 (1988)
 Star Trek vol. 2 Annual #2 (with James Fry) (1991)
 Strange Adventures #1–4, 6 (1950–1951)
 Strange Sports Stories #1–3 (1973–1974)
 Superboy #5, 8, 10–20, 22–23, 25–48, 50–58, 63, 70, 73, 80, 89, 92, 98, 100, 103–107, 112–113, 117–118, 121, 123, 126, 129, 132, 136, 138, 146–148 (1949–1968)
 Superboy vol. 2 #9–17 (1990–1991)
 Superman #51, 73, 76, 89, 97, 118, 121, 127, 130, 137, 139, 144–182, 186–187, 192–195, 197–199, 201, 207–215, 217–300, 303–306, 310–363, 365–368, 370–392, 395–396, 398–399, 401–403, 408-423 (1948–1986)
 Superman Annual #9–10 (1983–1984)
 Superman vol. 2, #35, 48 (full art); #50, 114 (among other artists) (1989–1996)
 The Superman Family #164–172, 174–181, 186–187 (1974–1978)
 Superman and Wonder Woman: The Computer Masters of Metropolis (1982)
 Superman: Victory by Computer (1981)
 Superman III: The Official Adaptation (1983)
 Superman IV: The Quest for Peace – Movie Special (1987)
 Superman's Girl Friend, Lois Lane #17, 27, 29, 32–33, 35–39, 41, 45, 54, 59, 68, 72, 86, 89, 91–92, 94, 96, 98, 102–103, 113, 122 (1960–1972)
 Superman's Pal Jimmy Olsen #1–91, 95, 104, 106–114, 116–117, 119, 121–123, 125–129, 131, 140 (1954–1971)
 Superman: The Man of Steel #5 (with Jon Bogdanove); #58 (among other artists) (1991–1996)
 Superman: The Secret Years, miniseries, #1–4 (1985)
 Swamp Thing vol. 2 #165 (with Phil Hester) (1996)
 Who's Who in the Legion of Super-Heroes #7 (among other artists) (1988)
 The Witching Hour #80 (1978)
 Wonder Woman #212, 214, 219, 221, 224 (1974–1976)
 Wonder Woman vol. 2 Annual #1 (among other artists) (1988)
 World's Finest Comics (Boy Commandos) #21–23, 25–31; 33–38 (Manhunters Around the World) #61–62; (other stories) #70; (Superman and Batman) #71–77, 84–85, 109, 116–117, 124, 141–173, 177–179, 184, 196–197, 223–225, 227, 230, 234, 239, 243, 245 (1946–1977)

Notes

References

External links

 Curt Swan in MNopedia, the Minnesota Encyclopedia
 
 "DC Profiles #7: Curt Swan at the Grand Comics Database
 Curt Swan at Mike's Amazing World of Comics
 Curt Swan, Superman Home Page
 Reed, Bill. (July 22, 2007) "365 Reasons to Love Comics: #203", Comics Should be Good, Comic Book Resources
Hughes, Bob. "Who Inked Curt Swan on Superman", Who's Whose in the DC Universe?
 Kimball, Kirk. "Super Artist Curt Swan!", Dial B for Blog #231

1920 births
1996 deaths
American comics artists
American people of Swedish descent
American Presbyterians
Artists from Minneapolis
DC Comics people
Golden Age comics creators
Inkpot Award winners
People from Willmar, Minnesota
People from Wilton, Connecticut
Silver Age comics creators
United States Army personnel of World War II
United States Army soldiers
Will Eisner Award Hall of Fame inductees